The Speedway Champions Cup was an annual motorcycle speedway competition that took place between 1986 and 1993, featuring the national champions of the sixteen participating nations. It was discontinued with the introduction of the Speedway Grand Prix in 1995.

The 1993 championship was held at Tampere and the winner was Tomasz Gollob of Poland.

Results
May 19, 1993
 Tampere

References

Speedway Champions Cup
Champions Cup